Maria José Silva (born 13 August 1983) is a Nicaraguan professional racing cyclist and a four-time national champion.

Major results
2018 
National Road Championships
1st  Time Trial
2nd Road Race

2019 
National Road Championships
1st  Time Trial
2nd Road Race

2020 
National Road Championships
1st  Time Trial
1st  Road Race

References

Living people
Nicaraguan female cyclists
1997 births